An armigerous clan (from armiger) is a Scottish clan, family or name which is registered with the Court of the Lord Lyon and once had a chief who bore undifferenced arms, but does not have a chief currently recognised as such by Lyon Court. Before 1745 all chiefs had arms; however, not all of these are recorded in the Public Register of All Arms and Bearings in Scotland, which was established in 1672.

Background
In Scottish heraldry, only chiefs or heads of clans, families, or names bear undifferenced arms. A clan is considered a "noble incorporation" because a clan chief is a title of honour in Scotland and the chief confers his or her noble status onto the clan. Because armigerous clans do not have such chiefs, they are not recognised as noble communities and have no legal standing under Scots law.

See also

 Lord Lyon
 Scottish heraldry
 List of Scottish clans

References

 
Armigerous clans